Juan Lebrón (23 June 1934 – 18 January 2013) was a Puerto Rican hurdler. He competed in the men's 110 metres hurdles at the 1952 Summer Olympics.

References

External links
 

1934 births
2013 deaths
Athletes (track and field) at the 1952 Summer Olympics
Puerto Rican male hurdlers
Olympic track and field athletes of Puerto Rico
Place of birth missing